Antonio Amico (died 1641) was a Roman Catholic Canon of Palermo, and ecclesiastical historian of Syracuse and Messina. He was also known as a historiographer of Philip IV of Spain and the religious and secular history of Sicily. Amico conducted extensive archival research in Sicily, discovering and transcribing important documents relating to the history of the island. He died in 1641, having published several historical works of great value, and leaving many others in manuscript. Amico's manuscripts were deposited after his death in the libraries of the duke of Madonia and of Jaime de Palafox y Cardona, archbishop of Palermo.

Main works 

 Sacræ Domus Templi, sive Militum Templariorum, Notitiæ et Tabularia, Palermo, 1636, fol.
  This work relates to the serious disputes between the three churches of Syracuse, Palermo, and Messina, respecting the metropolitan title and rights, and was inserted, with the answers, in the Thesaurus Antiquitatum Siciliæ, tom. II, Leyden, 1723. 
 
 
 A history of the Sicilian viceroys written in Spanish, and entitled Chronologia de los Virreyes, Presidentes, y de otras personas que han governado el Reyno de Sicilia, Palermo, 1640, 1687, 4to.
 Brevis et exacta narratio....Siciliæ regum annales ab anno 1060 usque ad præsens sæculum.

References

External links 

  
  
 

1641 deaths
17th-century Italian Roman Catholic priests
Italian historians of religion
Year of birth unknown
Religious leaders from Palermo
17th-century Italian historians